The 2000 Georgia Bulldogs football team represented the University of Georgia in the 2000 NCAA Division I-A football season. The Bulldogs completed the season with an 8–4 record. This was the Bulldogs' fifth and final season with Jim Donnan as their head coach.

Schedule

Depth chart

Rankings

References

Georgia
Georgia Bulldogs football seasons
Oahu Bowl champion seasons
Georgia Bulldogs football